Methylbutyric acid may refer to:

 2-Methylbutyric acid (2-methylbutanoic acid)
 3-Methylbutyric acid (3-methylbutanoic acid)

See also
 Methyl butyrate